Vedran Mimica (born 1954 in Zagreb) is a Croatian architect and educator who is perhaps best known for being the last director of the Berlage Institute in Rotterdam, the Netherlands, from 2002–2012.

References

External links
 http://www.theberlage.nl/persons/vedran_mimica

1954 births
Living people
Architects from Zagreb
Croatian expatriates in the Netherlands
Date of birth missing (living people)